Sport Club Penedense is a Brazilian football club based in Penedo, Alagoas. The senior team currently doesn't play in any league, having last participated in the Campeonato Alagoano Segunda Divisão in the 2019 season.

History
The club was founded on 3 January 1909. Penedense won the Campeonato Alagoano Second Level in 2000 and in 2004. They finished in the second position in the Campeonato Alagoano Second Level in 2011, losing the competition to CEO and thus they were promoted to the 2012 Campeonato Alagoano.

Achievements

 Campeonato Alagoano Second Level:
 Winners (2): 2000, 2004

Runner-up in 2000: Internacional of Pão de Açúcar-AL

Runner-up in 2004: Associação Atlética Dimensão Saúde

Stadium
Sport Club Penedense play their home games at Estádio Alfredo Leahy. The stadium has a maximum capacity of 6,000 people.

References

Association football clubs established in 1909
Football clubs in Alagoas
1909 establishments in Brazil